is a monorail station on the Chiba Urban Monorail in Chūō-ku in the city of Chiba, Chiba Prefecture, Japan. It is located 2.5 kilometers from the terminus at Chiba Station.

Lines
 Chiba Urban Monorail Line 1

Station layout
Yoshikawa-kōen Station is an elevated station with one island platform serving two tracks.

Platforms

History
Yoshikawa-kōen Station opened on March 24, 1999.

See also
 List of railway stations in Japan

External links

Chiba Urban Monorail website 

Railway stations in Japan opened in 1999
Railway stations in Chiba Prefecture